Vainshtein (originally an Eastern European spelling variant of Weinstein) is a German and Yiddish surname. Notable people with the surname include:

Gil Vainshtein (born 1984), Canadian soccer player
Lev Vainshtein (1916–2004), Soviet sport shooter
Samuil Vainshtein (1894–1942), Russian chess player
Sev’yan I. Vainshtein (1926–2008), Russian anthropologist and historian
Arkady Vainshtein (born 1942), Russian-American theoretical physicist

See also
 Weinstein

Jewish surnames
Yiddish-language surnames